The Liga Occidental de Béisbol Profesional (Western Professional Baseball League) was a baseball circuit that operated between 1954 and 1963 in Maracaibo, the capital city in the Venezuela state of Zulia. The league played their games at the old olympic stadium of Maracaibo.

The LOBP started to operate as a four-team league on December 7, 1954, and was managed by local entrepreneurs under the guidance of George Trautman, an American baseball executive, who also helped the league to join organized baseball to become a professional baseball circuit.

Innovations
Throughout the years, the league modified the number of games in the schedule and adopted playoffs. A significant innovation came before the 1953–1954 season, when the Venezuelan Professional Baseball League and the LOBP agreed to have the clubs with the best records from each circuit meet in a National Championship Series called El Rotatorio (the rotational), organized by the VPBL, which was the first and only in the league's history.

By then, both leagues were short of teams to play the regular season. Accordingly, the Cervecería Caracas and Navegantes del Magallanes teams represented the VPBL, while the Gavilanes and Pastora clubs represented the LOBP. Then, the Pastora team won the VPBL championship and advanced to the 1954 Caribbean Series.

Following an agreement between the two leagues, the interleague playoff games would be played immediately following the 1957–1958 season. As a result, the winning team would represent Venezuela in the 1958 Caribbean Series. The Rapiños de Occidente won the LOBP pennant, while the Industriales de Valencia did the same in the VPBL. After that, the Industriales swept the Rapiños, 4–0, in the best-of-seven series.

In the next playoff series, the Indios de Oriente VPBL champion team defeated the Rapiños, 4–3, and advanced to the 1959 Caribbean Series. Then, the Rapiños returned in 1959–1960 and won the pennant. This time, the Venezuelan Professional Baseball League season was suspended due to a players' strike, and the Rapiños club was invited to participate in the 1960 Caribbean Series.

Final years
During its 10 years of existence, the Zulia league confronted many crises, big and small, in that short period. For a time in the late 1950s, a lack of competitive balance seemed to pose the greatest threat to the league.

The beginning of the end came when the 1961–1962 season was cancelled. After that, the league resumed operations in 1962–1963, but the average attendance was less than half what it was in previous years.

Due to economic pressure, the LOBP folded on December 3, 1963, just one month after starting the 1963–1964 season.

Pastora was the only club that participated in all seasons of the league, winning two pennants, while the most successful team was the Rapiños, who collected a total of five titles during its six seasons in the circuit.

List of teams
Cardenales de Lara 
Centauros de Maracaibo  
Espadón BBC 
Gavilanes BBC  
Maracaibo BBC 
Lácteos de Pastora 
Petroleros de Cabimas 
Rapiños de Occidente

Seasons and statistics
Champion teams in bold

1954–1955

1955–1956

1956–1957
Note: Espadón did not return and was replaced by Centauros

1957–1958
Note: Rapiños replaced Gavilanes

1958–1959
Note: Gavilanes returned as a replacement for Centauros

1959–1960
Classified teams in bold

1960–1961
Notes: 
Cabimas and Gavilanes did not return
The new Maracaibo club folded during the midseason

1961–1962
 The season was cancelled

1962–1963
Note: Cardenales debuted while Cabimas returned
Classified teams in bold

1963–1964

Sources
 Gutiérrez, Daniel; Alvarez, Efraim; Gutiérrez (h), Daniel (2006). La Enciclopedia del Béisbol en Venezuela. LVBP, Caracas. 
 Gutiérrez, Daniel; González, Javier (2006); Records de la Liga Venezolana de Béisbol Profesional. LVBP. 
 Nuñez, José Antero (1994). Serie del Caribe de la Habana a Puerto La Cruz. JAN Editor.

External links
Virtual Urbe – La Historia del Béisbol en el Zulia: 1953-1954 – 1999-2000 (Spanish)
Las Series del Caribe (Spanish)

 
1954 establishments in Venezuela
1963 disestablishments in Venezuela
Baseball leagues in Venezuela
Winter baseball leagues
Defunct baseball leagues
Sports leagues established in 1954
Sports leagues disestablished in 1963